"Distance" is a song by American singer Omarion. It was released on February 10, 2017, as a standalone single.

Release
The song premiered on February 9, 2017, and was released for digital download as a single on the next day. In an interview with Noisey, Omarion called the song "a clash of culture and sound". The official remix by VICE was released on May 12, 2017.

Music video
The music video for the song premiered via Omarion's YouTube channel on February 9, 2017. It was filmed in South Africa.

Track listing
Digital download
"Distance" – 3:03

Digital download (VICE Remix)
"Distance (VICE Remix)" – 3:27

Charts

References

2017 songs
2017 singles
RCA Records singles
Omarion songs
Songs written by Lyrica Anderson
Songs written by Christopher Dotson
Songs written by Omarion
Songs written by Smash David
Songs written by Hitmaka